Britny Fox is an American glam metal band from the Philadelphia, Pennsylvania area, initially active from 1985 to 1992 then subsequently reforming from 2000 to 2003, again in 2006 to 2008 and final time reforming in 2015 to 2016. They are best known for their music video for "Girlschool" and their minor hit "Long Way to Love" (U.S. No. 100).  Bassist Billy Childs has been the only band member to be a part of each of the band's many lineups.

History
Britny Fox formed in 1985 in Philadelphia. The band was originally fronted by lead vocalist and rhythm guitarist "Dizzy" Dean Davidson. The band also featured Billy Childs on bass, former Cinderella guitarist Michael Kelly Smith on lead guitar and former Cinderella drummer Tony Destra on drums. The idea for the band's name was inspired by Davidson, who named the band in honor of a Welsh ancestor. They were described on a compilation as "trashy Victorian glam".

Thanks to their connections to Cinderella, the band was able to secure a major recording contract. However, just as things were beginning to look bright for the band, they soon dimmed. Tony Destra was killed in a car accident in 1987. Facing a tour, they hired drummer Adam West (aka Adam Ferraioli) temporarily until landing what turned out to be long-term drummer, John DiTeodoro (Johnny Dee), who had been the drummer for the band Waysted.

The band released a demo in 1986 titled In America, which drummer Tony Destra played on, and a demo in 1987 titled Rock Is Gonna Fight, which drummer Adam West played on. The band's self-titled debut album, released in 1988, was one of the most successful premieres of the 1988–89 season, selling gold (500,000+ copies) and bringing more than 625,000 fans to their 130+ shows opening for Poison and Warrant.  They also won Metal Edge magazine's 1988 Reader's Choice Award for Best New Band. After the release of the band's second album in 1989, Boys in Heat, Davidson departed, and formed the band Blackeyed Susan. He was replaced by Las Vegas native Tommy Paris aka Don Jillson formerly of the band Jillson. Ozzy Osbourne guitarist Zakk Wylde and Poison drummer Rikki Rockett guested on the band's third album, Bite Down Hard, which was released in 1991. However, the popularity of glam metal was on a decline around the time of the album's release, due to the rising popularity of the alternative rock/grunge movement. Britny Fox disbanded in 1992 for various reasons.

Britny Fox reunited in 2000 with the same line-up before their disbandment, and released a fourth studio album, Springhead Motorshark, in 2003. The band toured the US and Europe in 2007 and 2008. Guitarist Tommy Krash and former White Lion drummer Greg D'Angelo was supposed to join at that time, but he broke his foot during rehearsal and was replaced by Henry Now.  During this time Billy Childs and Tommy Krash began recording an acoustic album with select Britny Fox songs.  Time ran out before the start of the 2007 tour and the CD was never finished.  Tommy Krash released this CD in 2019 under the name Tommy Krash and Friends, BRITNY FOX the Acoustic Sessions.  The CD included Billy Childs and Tommy Paris as well as other special guests.  

As of late 2007, Britny Fox reformed under original bassist Billy Childs. The other former members of this line-up were lead vocalist and rhythm guitarist Jamie Fletcher, lead guitarist Greg Polcari, and drummer Henry Now.

Bassist Billy Childs and the new lineup had a minor but billed role in the horror film Incest Death Squad (2009).  Childs is currently playing bass in the North American Led Zeppelin tribute band Get the Led Out.

In 2010, "Dizzy" Dean Davidson unsuccessfully attempted to reunite the surviving members of the original line-up.

On April 25, 2015, the band announced that they had reunited with bassist Billy Childs, drummer Johnny Dee, long-time singer/rhythm guitarist Tommy Paris and new lead guitarist Chris Sanders as their line-up and that they are recording a new album.  This lineup played six shows in 2015 and eight shows in 2016, but none since. Their last performance was on a Monsters Of Rock cruise in October 2016. In a 2017 interview, Childs stated that the album project had been abandoned, but he stopped short of saying that the band had broken up.  In 2018, Sanders joined Britny Fox's rival band Ratt.

Line-ups

Members

2022 - Present 
Billy Childs – Bass, Backing Vocals (1985-Present)
Ronnie Rogers - Lead Vocals, Guitars (2022-Present)
Greg Polcari – Lead Guitar, Backing Vocals (late 2007–2014; 2022-Present)
 Henry Now – Drums, Backing Vocals (2007-2014; 2022-Present)

Past

Vocals/rhythm guitar
Dean Davidson (1985–1990)
Tommy Paris (1990-2007; 2015-2021)
Jamie Fletcher (2008–2014)

Lead guitar
Michael Kelly Smith (1985–1992; 2000–2003)
Tommy Krash (2006–2007)
Greg Polcari (Late 2007-2014 , 2022)

Drums
Tony Destra (1985–1987; died 1987)
Adam Ferraioli (1987)
Johnny Dee (1988-Present)
Greg D'Angelo (2006–2007)
Henry Now (2007; 2022)

Touring keyboards

Bobby Bunten (1988–1989)

Timeline

Discography

Studio albums

Video albums

Live albums

Compilation albums

Singles

Demos
In America (1986)
Rock Is Gonna Fight (1987)
The Bite Down Hard Demo Sessions (2003)
Forbidden Fruits: The Bite Down Hard Demos, Volume I (2020)
Forbidden Fruits: The Bite Down Hard Demos, Volume II (2020)

Bootlegs
Gudbuy T'Dean (2001)
Tommy Krash and Friends, Britny Fox the Acoustic Sessions 2019

Other appearances

Soundtrack

See also
List of glam metal bands and artists

References

1985 establishments in Pennsylvania
Glam metal musical groups from Pennsylvania
Heavy metal musical groups from Pennsylvania
Musical groups established in 1985
Musical groups from Philadelphia